Richard Lee Metcalfe (October 11, 1861 – March 31, 1954) was the last military Governor of Panama Canal Zone and one-time Mayor of Omaha, Nebraska.

Biography
He was born on October 11, 1861 to Richard Lee Metcalfe and Ellen Tazewell Edwards.
	
He began his career as an editor at the Omaha World-Herald, where he also authored a biography of William Jennings Bryan.

He died on March 31, 1954 in Omaha, Nebraska.

External links

References

1861 births
1954 deaths
Nebraska Democrats
Governors of the Panama Canal Zone
United States military governors
Mayors of Omaha, Nebraska
American newspaper editors